The  Aparokshanubhuti (Sanskrit: अपरोक्षानुभूतिः) is a famous work attributed to Adi Shankara. It is a popular introductory work (prakran grantha) that expounds Advaita Vedanta philosophy. It describes a method that seekers can follow to directly experience the essential truth of one's one nature. Thus, the work is literally titled Aparokshanubhuti, or Direct Experience. Swami Vimuktananda titles his translation Self-Realization.

Commentaries
The oldest extant commentary on this work is a Sanskrit commentary (Dipika or 'Elucidation') by Sri Vidyaranya. This work has been repeatedly translated and commented upon in other languages.

References

External links
 Translation of Aparokshanubhuti, by Swami Vimuktananda
 Vedanta Society, Swami Sarvapriyananda's lectures on  Aprokshanubhuti - 44 Part Series
Indian philosophy
Sanskrit texts
Advaita Vedanta texts